Saung Ta Nya Wal is a 1963 Burmese black-and-white drama film, directed by Bogalay Tint Aung starring Win Oo and Wah Wah Win Shwe.

Cast
Win Oo
Wah Wah Win Shwe

References

1963 films
1960s Burmese-language films
Burmese drama films
Films shot in Myanmar
1963 drama films